The Battle of Basoli was fought between the Mughal Empire and the Sikhs. The Mughal Army was defeated in the bloody Battle of Nirmohgarh (1702) earlier in the year. After the battle, Sikh Guru Gobind Singh moved to Basoli where the combined forces of the Hill Rajas also crossed River Sutlej and the Sikh Army was attacked by the Hill Rajas under Raja Ajmer Chand. Guru Gobind Singh put up a formidable defence at Basoli. Once again the enemy forces failed to subdue the Sikhs and the Khalsa Army forced the enemy to retreat by quickly defeating them at Basoli.

After the battle, the combined forces of the Mughals and Hill Rajas withdrew to Sirhind and Raja Ajmer Chand established a tactical peace treaty with Guru Gobind Singh.

References

History of Kashmir
1702 in India
Basoli